Rožnov pod Radhoštěm is a town in Vsetín District in the Zlín Region of the Czech Republic. It has about 16,000 inhabitants.

Administrative parts
Rožnov pod Radhoštěm is made up of one administrative part.

Geography

Rožnov pod Radhoštěm is located in the valley of the Rožnovská Bečva river. The northern part of the municipal territory lies in the Moravian-Silesian Beskids mountain range. The southern part with the built-up area lies in the Rožnov Furrow. The southernmost tip extends into the Hostýn-Vsetín Mountains. The whole territory of Rožnov pod Radhoštěm lies in the Beskydy Protected Landscape Area.

The Radhošť mountain whose name the town bears lies outside the territory.

Thanks to its location, protected by the surrounding hills from the north, the town has a favorable climate. The Carpathian winds that flow into the Rožnov Furrow dispel the fog and keep the weather in Rožnov sunny for most of the year.

History

The first written mention of Rožnov is from 1267. The village was founded during the colonization by Bruno von Schauenburg between 1246 and 1267, however, there is a possibility that there was already a small settlement that was only expanded. The castle on the Hradisko hill above Rožnov is first documented in 1310. In 1411, Rožnov was first referred to as a town. 

After the town was owned by several noble families, including lords of Kravaře, lords of Cimburk, it was acquired by the Zierotin family in 1548, who owned it until the 19th century. During their rule Rožnov economically developed. The glass-making and weaving became important in the town. Rožnov was known throughout the whole Habsburg monarchy for weaving linen and muslin. Local embroidery also gained fame. However, the inhabitants otherwise subsisted mainly on agriculture and pastoralism.

For a long time, the town consisted only of wooden buildings and slowly transformed into stone ones. In 1796, a favorable healing effect of the local specific climate has been discovered. A climatic spa was founded in Rožnov in 1820. The spa history ended with the World War II.

Demographics

Culture

Rožnov pod Radhoštěm lies in the cultural region of Moravian Wallachia. An international folklore festival called Rožnovské slavnosti ("Rožnov Festivities") is held in the town every year.

Sights
The town is known for the Wallachian Open Air Museum. It is the largest museum of its kind in the country. The life of the ancestors and folk architecture are presented in three separate areas called Little Wooden Town, Wallachian Village and Water Mill Valley.

On the Hradisko hill is the ruins of the Rožnov Castle. After being abandoned and occupied by bandits, it was demolished in 1538.

Notable people
Naphtali Keller (1834–1865), Austrian scholar; lived and died here
Leo Katz (1887–1982), American painter and muralist
Gustav Brom (1921–1995), big band leader and arranger; lived here
Emil Zátopek (1922–2000), athlete; buried here
Markéta Štusková (born 1974), tennis player
Alena Vašková (born 1975), tennis player
Martina Hingis (born 1980), tennis player; lived here as a child
Petra Maňáková (born 1989), handball player

Twin towns – sister cities

Rožnov pod Radhoštěm is twinned with:
 Bergen, Germany
 Körmend, Hungary
 Považská Bystrica, Slovakia
 Śrem, Poland

References

External links

Wallachian Open Air Museum

Cities and towns in the Czech Republic
Populated places in Vsetín District
Moravian Wallachia